Gaston High School may refer to one of these U.S. public schools:

East Gaston High School, in Mount Holly, North Carolina
Gaston High School, a former school in Gaston, Indiana, now consolidated into Wes-Del Community Schools
Gaston High School, a former school in Joinerville, Texas, which is now served by the West Rusk Independent School District
Gaston School, a kindergarten through twelfth-grade school in Gadsden, Alabama
Gaston Junior/Senior High School, Gaston, Oregon
North Gaston High School, in Dallas, North Carolina